Chhibramau is a constituency of the Uttar Pradesh Legislative Assembly covering the city of Chhibramau in the Kannauj district of Uttar Pradesh, India.

Chhibramau is one of five assembly constituencies in the Kannauj Lok Sabha constituency. Since 2008, this assembly constituency is numbered 196 amongst 403 constituencies.

Election results

2022

2017
Bharatiya Janta Party candidate Archana Pandey won in 2017 Uttar Pradesh Legislative Elections defeating Bahujan Samaj Party candidate Tahir Hussain Siddiqui by a margin of 37,224 votes.

Shaban khan

References

External links
 

Assembly constituencies of Uttar Pradesh
Kannauj district